Jonathan Shaquille González Álvarez (born 22 June 2000) is a Uruguayan professional footballer who plays as a defender.

Club career
A youth academy graduate of Defensor, González made his professional debut on 16 March 2019 in a 6–2 league defeat against Liverpool. He netted his first goal on 6 November 2019 in a 4–1 defeat against Plaza Colonia.

International career
González is a Uruguay youth international and has represented his nation at under-15 and under-17 levels. He was part of squad which finished as runners-up at 2015 South American U-15 Championship.

On 10 January 2020, he was called up to Uruguay U23 team for 2020 CONMEBOL Pre-Olympic Tournament to replace injured Emiliano Ancheta.

References

2000 births
Living people
Footballers from Montevideo
Uruguayan footballers
Uruguayan Primera División players
Defensor Sporting players
Uruguay youth international footballers
Association football defenders